The 1956–57 AHL season was the 21st season of the American Hockey League. Six teams played 64 games each in the schedule. The Providence Reds repeated their first overall finish in the regular season. The Cleveland Barons won their eighth Calder Cup championship.

Team changes
 The Pittsburgh Hornets move to Rochester, New York, becoming the Rochester Americans.

Final standings
Note: GP = Games played; W = Wins; L = Losses; T = Ties; GF = Goals for; GA = Goals against; Pts = Points;

Scoring leaders

Note: GP = Games played; G = Goals; A = Assists; Pts = Points; PIM = Penalty minutes

 complete list

Calder Cup playoffs
First round
Rochester Americans defeated Providence Reds 4 games to 1.
Cleveland Barons defeated Hershey Bears 4 games to 3.
Finals
Cleveland Barons defeated Rochester Americans 4 games to 1, to win the Calder Cup. 
 list of scores

All Star Classic
The 4th AHL All-Star game was played on October 23, 1956, at the Rhode Island Auditorium in Providence, Rhode Island. The defending Calder Cup champions Providence Reds won 4-0 versus the AHL All-Stars.

Trophy and Award winners
Team Awards

Individual Awards

See also
List of AHL seasons

References
AHL official site
AHL Hall of Fame
HockeyDB

American Hockey League seasons
2